Jean-Claude Skerl (16 August 1931 – 24 January 2002) was a French professional racing cyclist. He rode in the 1956 Tour de France.

References

External links
 

1931 births
2002 deaths
French male cyclists
Cyclists from Paris